Urban Runner (originally subtitled Lost In Town) is a French produced computer game developed by Coktel Vision and published by Sierra On-line.

The game is an interactive movie spanning four CD-ROMs. The plot follows an American journalist in Paris who has been framed for murder during the course of an investigation.

Urban Runner was not very popular at the time of its release, due to high graphics and monitor resolution requirements. The minimum requirement was 640×480, with 256 colors. For the best quality, 640×480, 32-bit color was needed. Few reviews have been published concerning the game.

The lead is played by Brandon Massey, who also played the lead in the Sierra title Police Quest IV: Open Season (1993), making this his second and final appearance in a Sierra game.

Plot
You are Max Gardner (Brandon Massey), an American journalist in Paris, investigating a story about a big drug dealer who is covered by some influential politician. To get the dealer talking, you offer him incriminating photographs in exchange for some information. When Max arrives at the meeting point, the drug lord is dead and Max is mistaken for the killer.

While evading the authorities, Max continues his investigation and finds an ally in Adda - the murdered drug dealer's lover - and the two of them work to uncover the conspiracy behind the murders.

Gameplay

The game itself is an interactive movie controlled with a mouse. As with many games of this type the player progresses by collecting items, talking to characters and solving puzzles. The player will also accumulate Clues - pieces of information which are essential to solving the mystery - which are separate from the inventory and cannot be given away or lost.

Should the player be having difficulty in progressing, they begin the game with three Jokers to use, which act as a hint system.

The player's viewpoint switches from Max to Adda at certain points in the game and sometimes gives the player a choice of which character to control. However, both characters must have the puzzles in their respective areas solved to progress.

Gameplay can be divided into Clue and Action sections. Clue sections are puzzle-based with no time limit; players may have to explore an environment, talk to characters or interact with objects to progress. Action sections give the player a short amount of time to make a decision - making the wrong choice usually results in your character's death.

Compatibility 

Urban Runner was developed to run under DOS and Windows 3.1, making it incompatible with modern Windows computers. However, it is fully playable using the game engine recreation software ScummVM, as part of its support for the Gob engine (which is used for games developed by Coktel Vision).

Development
According to the French newspaper Les Échos, Urban Runner was created by a team of 50 people. By December 1995, it had been in development for one-and-a-half years and its budget had risen to 15 F million. Three months were spent on the game's live-action film shoots. Les Échos reported that Urban Runners budget had climbed high enough that it would need to sell 500,000 units to break even.

References

External links
 
 
Urban Runner at GameFAQs
Urban Runner at The Sierra Chest
Game Manual at SierraHelp

1996 video games
Sierra Entertainment games
Coktel Vision games
DOS games
Windows games
Adventure games
First-person adventure games
Full motion video based games
Interactive movie video games
ScummVM-supported games
Video games set in Paris
Video games developed in France
Fiction about murder